"Nuclear Device (The Wizard of Aus)" is a 1979 single by British band The Stranglers. The second single from their album The Raven, it peaked at No. 36 on the UK Singles Chart.

Hugh Cornwell stated in Song by Song that the song was written about the then Premier of Queensland, Joh Bjelke-Petersen. It also makes references to gerrymandering, and genetic mutation in animals.

References

The Stranglers songs
1979 singles
1979 songs
Song recordings produced by Alan Winstanley
United Artists Records singles